James Edward Brown (March 22, 1920 – April 11, 1992) was an American film and television actor. He was perhaps best known for playing Lt. Ripley Masters in the American western television series The Adventures of Rin Tin Tin.

Life and career 
Brown was born in Desdemona, Texas. He attended Baylor University, representing the university at Tennis. Brown began his acting career in 1941 with an uncredited role as a medic in the film Ride, Kelly, Ride. His first credited role was in the 1942 film The Forest Rangers. Brown starred, co-starred and appeared on films including The Good Fellows, Objective, Burma!, Gun Street, The Big Fix, When the Clock Strikes, Air Force, Irma la Douce, The Fabulous Texan, Young and Willing, The Gallant Legion, The Younger Brothers, Corvette K-225, Sands of Iwo Jima, Yes Sir, That's My Baby, Our Hearts Were Young Gay (and its sequel Our Hearts Were Growing Up), Chain Lightning, Missing Women, Inside the Mafia, The Groom Wore Spurs and Going My Way.

In 1954, Brown joined the cast of the new ABC western television series The Adventures of Rin Tin Tin, in which he played Lt. Ripley Masters. After the series ended in 1959 Brown guest-starred in television programs including Gunsmoke, The Alfred Hitchcock Hour, Lassie (3 episodes), The Virginian, Laramie, Route 66, Barbary Coast, Daniel Boone, Bronco, Honey West and Murder, She Wrote. From 1979 to 1986 Brown played the recurring role of "Detective Harry McSween" in 39 episodes of the soap opera television series Dallas.

For about a decade from the mid-1960s Brown left acting to found a company making weight belts, eventually selling the company to Faberge. He returned to acting in television in the 1970s.

Death 
Brown died in April 1992 of lung cancer at his home in Woodland Hills, California, at the age of 72. He was cremated.

References

External links 

James Brown at Turner Classic Movies

Rotten Tomatoes profile

1920 births
1992 deaths
People from Texas
Male actors from Texas
Deaths from lung cancer in California
American male film actors
American male television actors
20th-century American male actors
Baylor University alumni
Western (genre) television actors
American male tennis players